Francis Edwards is the name of:

Sir Francis Edwards, 1st Baronet (1852–1927), British Liberal Party politician
Francis S. Edwards (1817–1899), U.S. Representative from New York
Francis Edwards (architect) (1784–1857), British neo-classical architect
Francis Edwards (The Bill), fictional character from the British television series
F. Henry Edwards, English leader in the Reorganized Church of Jesus Christ of Latter Day Saints

See also
Francis Edwardes (disambiguation)
Frank Edwards (disambiguation)
James Francis Edwards (born 1921), decorated Canadian fighter pilot during World War II